This list shows notable triplestores, APIs, and other storages that have implemented the W3C SPARQL standard.
Amazon Neptune
Apache Marmotta
AllegroGraph
Eclipse RDF4J
Apache Jena with ARQ
Blazegraph
Cray Urika-GD
IBM Db2 - Removed in v11.5.
KAON2
MarkLogic
Mulgara
NitrosBase
Ontotext GraphDB
Oracle DB Enterprise Spatial & Graph
RDFLib Python library
Redland / Redstore
Virtuoso

See also
Comparison of structured storage software

Computer languages
Data modeling languages
Declarative programming languages
Query languages
RDF data access
Resource Description Framework
Web services
World Wide Web Consortium standards
SPARQL